The Edward R. Gesler House, at 411 W. Missouri Ave. in Artesia, New Mexico, was built in 1907.  It was listed on the National Register of Historic Places in 1984.

It is one of ten houses of cast-stone construction which were together listed on the National Register in 1983.

References

		
National Register of Historic Places in Eddy County, New Mexico
Queen Anne architecture in New Mexico
Houses completed in 1907